Le Renouveau was a French language newspaper published in Tunis, Tunisia. It existed from 1988 to 2011 and was the official organ of the ruling party of Tunisia, Constitutional Democratic Rally (RCD).

History and profile
Le Renouveau was first published on 22 March 1988 as a continuation of another French language daily L'Action which was one of the official media outlet of the now-defunct Neo Destour Party. The publisher of Le Renouveau was Dar El Amal publishing and the paper was based in Tunis.

Le Renouveau was the organ of the ruling party, RCD, which was the successor the Neo Destour Party. RCD also owned Al Hurriya.

Mohamed Nejib Ouerghi served as the editor-in-chief of the paper. It frequently featured articles which were used to legitimate the rule of the President Zine El Abidine Ben Ali. The paper ceased publication in 2011 following the removal of Zine El Abidine Ben Ali.

In 1985 the estimated circulation of the paper was 13,500 copies whereas it was 33,000 copies in 2003.

References

1988 establishments in Tunisia
2011 disestablishments in Tunisia
Defunct newspapers published in Tunisia
French-language newspapers published in Tunisia
Mass media in Tunis
Newspapers established in 1988
Publications disestablished in 2011
Former state media